Rear Admiral Robyn Margaret Walker,  (born 1 July 1959) is an Australian medical practitioner and a retired senior officer of the Royal Australian Navy (RAN). Walker became the first female admiral in the RAN when she was appointed Surgeon-General of the Australian Defence Force on 16 December 2011.

As Surgeon-General, Walker commanded the Joint Health Command until her retirement in December 2015. Air Vice Marshal Tracy Smart was appointed as her successor as Joint Health Commander.

Notes

References

External links
Official biography at www.navy.gov.au; Similar biography at www.defence.gov.au/vcdf 
CDRE Walker, Photo ~2005. (Copyright unknown)
RADM Walker, Copyright photo, 2011.
14 min TV interview, 25 April 2013, www.abc.net.au.

1959 births
Australian military doctors
Female admirals
Living people
Members of the Order of Australia
People from Queensland
Royal Australian Navy admirals
University of Queensland alumni
Women in the Australian military